Lucien Lange (25 May 1904 – 11 July 1982) was a French racing cyclist. He rode in the 1928 Tour de France.

References

1904 births
1982 deaths
French male cyclists
Place of birth missing